Count Louis Günther of Nassau (15 February 1575 in Dillenburg – 12 September 1604, outside Sluis) was a Count of Nassau-Katzenelnbogen and a Dutch lieutenant general of cavalry in the Eighty Years' War.

He was the thirteenth and youngest child of John VI of Nassau and his first wife Elisabeth of Leuchtenberg (1537–1579).

He studied in Switzerland and then, like many of his brothers, he joined the Ducht army.  He fought under his brother William Louis and his cousin Maurice.  In 1596 he participated as a volunteer in the Capture of Cadiz.  His cousin appointed him to lieutenant general in 1600 and he excelled in the Battle of Nieuwpoort.  He then managed to take Wachtendonk.  In 1602 he led an attack on Luxembourg.  In 1604 he took part in the siege of Sluis, where he died of a fever.

He married on 7 June 1601 with Countess Anna Margareta of Manderscheid-Gerolstein (10 August 1575 – 4 March 1606).  Anna Margareta was the daughter of Count John Gerhard of Manderscheid-Gerolstein and the widow of Wirich VI, Count of Daun-Falkenstein.  The marriage remained childless.

References 
 
 Lodewijk Günther [Nassau], in: Encarta Winkler Prins Online Encyclopedie 2007

External links 

 Genealogy

Counts of Nassau
House of Nassau
1575 births
1604 deaths
16th-century German people
Sons of monarchs